Big Business is a 1934 British comedy film directed by Cyril Gardner and starring Claude Hulbert, Eve Gray and Ernest Sefton. It was made at Teddington Studios as a quota quickie by the British subsidiary of Warner Brothers.  It is notably the second film of the same name that James Finlayson starred in.

Plot summary

Cast
 Claude Hulbert as Reggie Pullett / Shayne Carter  
 Eve Gray as Sylvia Brent  
 Ernest Sefton as Mac  
 James Finlayson as P.C.  
 Hal Walters as Spike  
 Maude Zimbla as Nina

References

Bibliography
 Wood, Linda. British Films, 1927–1939. British Film Institute, 1986.

External links
 
 
 

1934 films
1934 comedy films
British comedy films
Films directed by Cyril Gardner
Films shot at Teddington Studios
Films set in England
British black-and-white films
1930s English-language films
1930s British films
Warner Bros. films
Quota quickies